LaserTank (also known as Laser Tank) is a computer puzzle game requiring logical thinking to solve a variety of levels. It is open source, careware, and can be used for free. The player must be able to concentrate and think ahead as in playing chess or checkers. Contradicting its name, LaserTank is in no way an action game. Although a player may try to solve a level quickly, there is no requirement to do so, so poor coordination and poor reflexes will not impede a player. Experience allows the player to learn a number of techniques and tricks that need to be used to solve difficult levels.
LaserTank is NP-complete
meaning that one can construct levels which are hard to solve for even computers.

Gameplay
LaserTank is played on a 16 x 16 grid. The player must use the tank to reach a flag in every level without "dying". The player can move the tank in four directions and can fire a laser that is used to move or destroy objects. The number of moves and shots it takes to complete a level are recorded in a high score list. The scores are then compared with the current "Global High Score" file.

Expansion
Thousands of new levels can be downloaded. A level editor is available that has enabled players to create thousands of new levels. Players may upload their new levels for others to download and solve. Other tools are available that have enabled players to create many new LTG (LaserTank Graphics) visual themes. A setup tool for assisting in the updating of the game is also available, and is useful in that it keeps track of high scores and level modifications contained in downloaded updates. A number of other applications and downloads are available at the official LaserTank website.

Genres (level types) 
The variety of objects within the game allows for the creation of a great variety of levels. Easy levels are grouped into a "Beginner" collection for younger or less-skilled players. Typical levels of varying difficulty are grouped into a series of "Challenge" collections. There is also a collection of levels requiring the pushing of blocks around, resembling another computer puzzle game called Sokoban.

Another "Special" collection contains unconventional levels that are not typical of the game. Some may be repetitive. Other levels have been created that are machine-like, or function as virtual computers that perform simple mathematical calculations or sequential tasks. Some of these so-called special levels may only serve as demonstrations or artwork, and may not even be solvable since they may require more shots or moves than the game can record.

There are also collections of downloadable tutorial levels that have been created to demonstrate the many tips and tricks of LaserTank to help other players learn the details of gameplay.

Languages
The LaserTank Translation Kit can be used to create language kits in order to play LaserTank in languages other than the default English. Language kits are currently available for French, Dutch, Spanish, Portuguese-Br, Croatian, Chinese (Traditional), Chinese (Simplified), German, Swedish, Serbian, and Turkish.

LaserTank community and forum
There is an online Yahoo! LaserTank group that provides game support. Help can be requested from other players and downloadable documents are also available. LaserTank gameplay, level editing, occasional new game versions, as well as a wide variety of other topics are discussed.

History
LaserTank was created by Jim Kindley (JEK Software) who started writing LaserTank in 1995. Kindley's main goal was to make the game for free, but have people all over the world send levels to add to it. Kindley is not currently involved with LaserTank, but has stated "Maybe someday I will re-enter the world of LaserTank". Donald Drouin of Canada is now the official LaserTank manager who gathers new levels and regularly updates the official LaserTank website, as well as providing interesting statistics to other players regarding current records and high scores.

A port for iOS was released on February 1, 2015 by Jack Powell.

See also
 Lists of video games
 List of puzzle video games
 Logic puzzle
 List of open source games
 List of freeware games

References

External links
 Official LaserTank homepage
 Official LaserTank forum
 LaserTank French homepage
 LaserTank German homepage
 Read and contribute to a collection of comments at cnet.
 Educational Value of Sokoban Puzzles
 LaserTank on Apple's App Store
 groups.yahoo.com
 Fr.groups.yahoo.com

1995 video games
Puzzle video games
Logic puzzles
Video games developed in the United States
Windows games
Freeware games